Solar power in South Africa includes photovoltaics (PV) as well as concentrated solar power (CSP). 
In 2016, South Africa had 1,329 MW of installed solar power capacity. 
Installed capacity is expected to reach 8,400 MW by 2030.

In 2014 several solar farms were commissioned, including the 96 MW Jasper Solar Energy Project, one of Africa's largest photovoltaic power stations providing enough solar power for 30,000 homes.

Solar resource 

The total solar potential of South Africa by area exceeds the level of 1,600 kWh / m2.

Government programs 
As of 1 January 2016 the South African government gave a tax incentive through the South African Revenue Service for the installation of photovoltaic solar energy generation systems. Depending on the size defined in MWp (Megawatt peak) of the photovoltaic solar system, the amended section 12 B of the Income Tax Act No. 58 of 1962 stipulates the size of the tax shield available through accelerated depreciation to the commercial tax paying entity.

Photovoltaic solar systems smaller or equal to 1 MWp can be depreciated in one year, granting the commercial tax paying entity a 28% discount on the system.
The tax shield applies even if the photovoltaic solar system is installed mid-year or if the system is not new. A repayment time of one year and ongoing electricity savings for the remainder of the system's lifetime can be achieved by financing a portion of the cost of the system.
Photovoltaic solar systems greater than 1 MWp are depreciated with the schedule 50%, 30%, and 20% in the first 3 years respectively.

Adoption and government conflict of interest 
Despite this aggressive tax incentive, South African companies are slow to adopt grid-connected photovoltaic solar systems due to the lack of public dialogue from the government concerning photovoltaic solar energy.

The lack of public dialog is partially due to the conflict that arises between the government, its state-owned enterprise Eskom, the local renewable energy sector as well as international obligations such as the Kyoto Protocol and the Paris Agreement of which South Africa is a signatory. The state-owned electricity utility Eskom that provides 90% (85% from coal) of South Africa's electricity and depends on electricity sales to function. Due to alleged corruption and mismanagement of funds in the years leading up to 2017, Eskom has been forced to increase tariffs by 340% over 10 years. Despite this tariff increase Eskom is in poor financial health as of 2017. The utility has stated that the increase in renewable energy generation directly impacts its revenue stream, which makes it difficult for it to meet its debt obligations. A government bailout has not been ruled out. The utility, relying mainly on coal-fired power stations also fears that renewable energy generation will directly impact coal jobs.

Through its holding in Eskom, the South African government is dependent on Eskom's revenue stream to avoid a bailout with public funds.

Municipal programs 
In addition to the government tax incentive for photovoltaic solar energy generation, certain municipalities have further incentives for residential and commercial customers, such as a feed-in tariff or net metering.

Operational and projected plants 

The 50 MW Touwsrivier CPV Solar Project  concentrated photovoltaics (CPV) power plant was constructed in Touwsrivier, in Western Cape, South Africa in December 2014.  A 75 MW solar power plant started production on September 13, 2013 in Kalkbult, in the Northern Cape (implemented by Scatec).
Two other PV plants were completed by the same company in 2014. These are located at Linde in the Northern Cape and Dreunberg in the Eastern Cape, both sun drenched regions boasting some of the best conditions for solar power in the world. Altogether, these 3 plants provide power for around 90,000 South African households.

Sonnedix and Juwi have announced that they will construct an 86 MW solar photovoltaic (PV) plant in the Northern Cape province. The Mulilo Sonnedix plant in Prieska plant will be larger than any PV plant currently on line in the African continent, and was awarded through the third round of the South Africa's Renewable Energy Independent Power Producer Procurement Programme (REIPPPP). Financial close on the project is targeted for July 2014, with commissioning planned for the second half of 2016.

Iberdrola has completed the Jasper Solar Energy Project solar photovoltaic (PV) power plant, which at 96 MW is the largest in Africa, the company announced. It was carried out in a desert area with extreme temperatures and involved the installation of over 325,000 PV modules. This PV plant is located in Northern Cape province in a remote, semi-desert location. It covers a surface area equivalent to 205 football pitches.

Acciona has put the Sishen solar photovoltaic (PV) plant into service in December 2014. It has a peak capacity of 94.3 megawatts (MWp) – 74 nominal MW – and is located in Dibeng in the Northern Cape province. Its horizontal tracking structures allow the PV panels to capture more radiation by following the sun's trajectory across the sky. The plant will produce electricity equivalent to the consumption of around 100,000 South African households, or around 420,000 people (2011 South African household size = 3.6 persons).

As of January 2015 a total of 593 MW produced from PV plants were connected to the grid.

A consortium led by ACWA Power International (Saudi Arabia) has completed commissioning of a 50 MW concentrating solar power (CSP) project in South Africa's Northern Cape in Dec-2015.
The Bokpoort CSP project includes 9.3 hours of thermal energy storage, which will allow it to meet demand during peak hours between 5 and 9 PM. ACWA describes this system as the largest thermal storage system ever built for a CSP plant of its size and capacity. The South African solar power plant has set a new African record (26 April 2016) for the continuous, round the clock supply of electricity.

Two CSP plants are being built by Abengoa in the Northern Cape. Khi Solar One is a Solar Tower plant of 50 MW capacity near Upington and Kaxu Solar One is a Parabolic Trough plant of 100 MW capacity near Pofadder with storage capability for 3 hours. Xina Solar One has a total installed capacity of 100 MW, also near Pofadder.

Solar thermal energy 

The South African government requires renewable energy to replace 10,000 GWh of electricity by 2013. The Department of Energy estimates that 23% of this target can be met through solar water heating and Eskom is therefore actively encouraging consumers to switch to solar water heating.

According to the International Energy Agency, at the end of 2016, the cumulative installed capacity of solar thermal collectors in South Africa reached 1,336 MWth, or 1.91 Mm2 (million m2) of sensors, very far behind the world leader: China (324,510 MWth) and the United States (17,686 MWth); South Africa ranked 19th in the world with 0.3% of the world total, but 1st in Africa. The South African market was 88.4 MWth of new installations in 2016, or only 0.2% of the global market. South African solar thermal saved 146.5 kTep of energy and 472 kT CO2eq in 2016.

Residential solar PV 
South Africa has experienced an increase in the installation of solar PV since 1992. The low electricity tariffs offered by Eskom prior to 2010 has led to a recently rapid installation increase. The shift in installations can be seen across all segments of consumers including industrial, agricultural, commercial and residential. There are predictions that indicate that there would be a continuous decline in the cost of Solar PV well beyond 2020.

The steady decline in solar PV and battery storage costs creates for an increasingly attractive business case to support self ownership with backup intervention and storage in the absence of grid-based power.  The statistics for the absorption of solar PV presently can barely be regarded as comprehensive or official considering the fact that they are based on industry estimates.

Installation numbers remain unclear because of the absence of an official or effective Small-Scale Embedded Generation (SSEG2) registration process for low-voltage connected customers. Although the National Energy Regulator of South Africa (NERSA) confirmed that they will be initiating a formal national registration process for SSEG, chances are they may only be fully operational in the next 2 to 3 years.

However, certain municipalities have initiated their own registration processes to allow connection to their distribution grid infrastructure. "The South African Department of Energy (DoE) has recently released Schedule 2 to the Electricity Act of 2006 which revised the licensing and registration requirements for categories of generators. In accordance with these new rules, generators smaller than 1MW are exempted from having to obtain a license but need to be registered with NERSA."

An approximately 285MWP5 (DC) of small scale solar PV (rooftop and ground-mounted) was installed in South Africa as at December 2017 according to the data received from different sources. The total number of installations equates up to 139,556 units. The installation of small to medium scale solar PV leads to a market share percentage of 0.65% of the total national generation capacity of 44.134GW6. "In addition to these grid-based installations, there are 87,150 off-grid systems with a total installed capacity of 14.35MWP."  

Low and middle-income households have partially participated in the growing uptake of solar PV (SSEG) systems in South Africa for reasons pertaining to affordability and access to finance. Unlike most other countries where grid-connected solar PV technologies are released to low-income households mostly on full or partial subsidization, PV implementation initiatives of such kind in South Africa are targeted generally toward households lacking electricity.

Middle-income households with average earnings of $351.52 to $703.04 per month have better purchasing power. "They generally have improved security of tenure and greater access to electricity". Middle-income households consume twice as much electricity as low-income households. Although middle-income households earn more than twice the average monthly income of low-middle households, it would yet be difficult for the majority to qualify for the loan necessary to purchase a system.

In 2014, a multinational company by the name JA Solar Holdings which is headquartered in Beijing, China began working with local construction companies in South Africa to provide small-scale rooftop Solar PV systems to the suburbs of several South African cities. These systems were installed on the roof of low-income households. With these JA Solar systems, the house dwellers were able to have access to free electricity from their roofs.

Statistics

See also 

 Renewable energy in South Africa
 Department of Energy (South Africa)
 Renewable energy in Africa
 List of countries by electricity production from renewable sources
 List of power stations in South Africa
 Energy in South Africa
 Renewable energy by country

References

External links 

 
 SESSA
 Renewable Energy South Africa Solar Power Article
 www.eskom.co.za — Eskom
 http://www.energy.gov.za/ — Department of Energy (South Africa)
 www.nersa.org.za/ — National Energy Regulator
 Energy Blog - Renewable Energy Power Plants Database